Claire Bonnafé is a French writer and painter.

Works 
1977: Le Bruit de la mer, Éditions Balland,  
1990: Le Guetteur immobile, Éditions Balland, Grand prix des lectrices de Elle 1991
1997: Une lumière dans l'île, Éditions du Seuil,

Prizes 
 Prix of the Société des gens de lettres for Le Bruit de la mer
 Grand prix des lectrices de Elle for Le Guetteur immobile

References

External links 
 Une lumière dans l'île, Claire Bonnafé on Éditions du Seuil
 Le prix « ELLE » pour elles on L'Humanité (4 June 1991)
 Claire Bonnafé on Prix-Littéraires.net
 Claire Bonnafe's Books on Goodreads

20th-century French novelists
French women novelists
Living people
20th-century French women writers
Year of birth missing (living people)